Yilgarn was an electoral district of the Legislative Assembly in the Australian state of Western Australia from 1894 to 1930.

First created for the 1894 election, the district was located in the Goldfields region. In 1898, it was centred on the town of Southern Cross and included several other settlements along the Eastern Goldfields Railway, such as Yellowdine. At the 1930 election, the district was amalgamated with the neighbouring district of Coolgardie to form the new district of Yilgarn-Coolgardie. Sitting member Edwin Corboy transferred to the new seat.

Members for Yilgarn

Election results

References

Yilgarn
Constituencies established in 1894
1894 establishments in Australia
Constituencies disestablished in 1930
1930 disestablishments in Australia